Professor Robert Lewis Maynard CBE, FRCP, FRCPath, FFOM (born 1951) is a British toxicologist.

Maynard was head of the air pollution unit at the United Kingdom Department of Health from 1990 to 2011.

He served as editor of the World Health Organization's Air Quality Guidelines for Europe.

He became an Honorary Professor in the Institute of Public Health at the University of Birmingham in 2000.

He was made a Commander of the Order of the British Empire (CBE) in the 2000 New Year Honours.

References

External links 
 

1951 births
British toxicologists
Commanders of the Order of the British Empire
Fellows of the Royal College of Pathologists
Fellows of the Royal College of Physicians
Living people